This is a list of Nigerian male boxers. Boxing is a combat sport in which two people wearing protective gloves throw punches at each other for a predetermined set of time in a boxing ring.

 Friday Ahunanya
 Muideen Akanji 
 Jegbefumere Albert 
 Ray Amoo 
 Davidson Andeh 
 Akeem Anifowoshe 
 Efetobor Wesley Apochi 
 Efe Ajagba 
 Tunji Awojobi 
 Fatai Ayinla 
 Hogan Bassey 
 Nestor Bolum 
 Jonathan Dele 
 Duncan Dokiwari 
 Olanrewaju Durodola 
 Ehinomen Ehikhamenor 
 Onorede Ehwareme 
 Isaac Ekpo 
 Billy Famous 
 Muideen Ganiyu 
 Ike Ibeabuchi 
 Richard Igbineghu 
 Kingsley Ikeke 
 Isaac Ikhouria 
 Dauda Izobo 
 David Izonritei 
 Emmanuel Izonritei 
 Jacklord Jacobs 
 Hogan Jimoh 
 Yaqub Kareem 
 Lateef Kayode 
 Peter Konyegwachie 
 Lukman Lawal 
 Rasheed Lawal 
 Nojim Maiyegun 
 Eddie Ndukwu 
 Obisia Nwankpa 
 Emmanuel Nwodo 
 Effiong Okon 
 Andy Ologun 
 Gbenga Oloukun 
 Fatai Onikeke 
 Joe Orewa 
 Teke Oruh 
 Christopher Ossai 
 Cyril Panther 
 Samuel Peter 
 Mohammed Sabo 
 Ahmed Sadiq 
 Dick Tiger
 Tony Saibu

References

Nigerian male boxers
Boxers